No Alternative is an alternative rock compilation album produced by Paul Heck and Chris Mundy.  It was released in 1993 to benefit AIDS relief. The album features original tracks and cover versions from bands who went on to define the alternative rock scene of the 1990s. It was released with two different versions of album art: the standard version depicting a boy (without the Nirvana song listed on the back and liner notes), and the alternate version depicting a girl (some with and some without the Nirvana song listed on the back and liner notes).

A television special hosted by MTV and a VHS home video release featured live performances, music videos, and information about AIDS.

On 20 April 2013, as part of the annual internationally celebrated Record Store Day, No Alternative was released for the first time on vinyl as a special 20th anniversary edition LP.  Stereogum lauded the album in a retrospective piece, saying that "it captures the American alternative scene at its commercial, cultural, and critical peak."  In an interview with Radio New Zealand, producer Paul Heck discussed the history of the Red Hot Organization and the anniversary of No Alternative, saying that the response from the musicians asked to contribute was "overwhelmingly positive" and that some artists even wrote songs specifically for the compilation.

Album track listing

Home video track listing

 Matthew Sweet "Superdeformed"
directed by Kevin Kerslake
 Neneh Cherry "Athens, Georgia 1993"
directed by Jim McKay & Michael Stipe
 Urge Overkill "Take a Walk"
directed by Matt Mahurin
 Hole, Luscious Jackson, Free Kitten, Huggy Bear & Bikini Kill "No Alternative Girls"
directed by Tamra Davis
 The Smashing Pumpkins "Hot Heads"
directed by Jennie Livingston
 Sarah McLachlan "Hold On"
directed by Nick Gomez
 The Breeders "Iris"
directed by Hal Hartley
 Patti Smith "Memorial Tribute"
directed by Derek Jarman
US live performances:
 Goo Goo Dolls "Bitch"
directed by Beth McCarthy
 The Smashing Pumpkins "Glynis"
directed by Beth McCarthy
 The Smashing Pumpkins "Today"
directed by Beth McCarthy
 Buffalo Tom "For All to See"
directed by Beth McCarthy
UK live performances:
 The Breeders "Iris"
directed by Neil Breakwell
 Suede "The Next Life"
directed by Derek Jarman
Spoken word:
 Maggie Estep "No More Mr Nice Girl"
 Lou Reed "Busload of Faith"
 David Wojnarowicz "Untitled"

Charts

See also
Red Hot Organization

References

External links
No Alternative at NYU's Fales Library and Special Collections' Guide to the Red Hot Organization Archive (1989–2004)

Red Hot Organization albums
Albums produced by Richard Dashut
Albums produced by Paul Fox (record producer)
Albums produced by Billy Corgan
1993 compilation albums
Alternative rock compilation albums
1993 video albums
1993 live albums
Live video albums
Music video compilation albums
Arista Records compilation albums
Grunge compilation albums
Grunge video albums
Alternative rock video albums
Live alternative rock albums